is a Japanese politician of the Democratic Party of Japan, a member of the House of Representatives in the Diet (national legislature). A native of Takamatsu, Kagawa and graduate of the  University of Tokyo, he joined the Ministry of Home Affairs in 1994. Leaving the ministry in 2003, he ran unsuccessfully for the House of Representatives in the same year. Two years later, he ran again and lost for a second time. He ran for a third time in 2009 and was elected for Kagawa's 1st district.

References

External links 
 Official website in Japanese.

1971 births
Living people
Politicians from Kagawa Prefecture
University of Tokyo alumni
Members of the House of Representatives (Japan)
Democratic Party of Japan politicians
21st-century Japanese politicians
People from Takamatsu, Kagawa